Wilhelm Brüderlin (born 20 October 1894, date of death unknown) was a Swiss rower who competed in the 1920 Summer Olympics.

In 1920 he was part of the Swiss boat, which won the gold medal in the coxed four event. He was also a member of the Swiss eights which was eliminated in the first round of the eight competition.

References

External links
 profile

1894 births
Year of death unknown
Swiss male rowers
Olympic gold medalists for Switzerland
Olympic rowers of Switzerland
Rowers at the 1920 Summer Olympics
Olympic medalists in rowing
Medalists at the 1920 Summer Olympics
European Rowing Championships medalists
20th-century Swiss people